The 2006 World Golf Championships-Barbados World Cup took place 7–10 December at the Sandy Lane Resort and Country Club in Barbados. It was the 52nd World Cup and the seventh and last as a World Golf Championship event. 24 countries competed and each country sent two players. The prize money totaled $4,000,000 with $1,400,000 going to the winning pair. The German team of Bernhard Langer and Marcel Siem won. They defeated the Scottish team of Colin Montgomerie and Marc Warren at the first playoff hole.

Qualification and format
The leading 18 available players from different countries in the Official World Golf Ranking on 11 September 2006 qualified automatically. These 18 players then selected a player from their country to compete with them. The person they pick had to be ranked within the top 100 on the Official World Golf Ranking as of 11 September 11. If there was no other player from that country within the top 100, then the next highest ranked player would be their partner. World qualifiers were held in October 2006. Six countries earned their spot in this way, four from the Asian qualifier and two from the South American qualifier.

The tournament was a 72-hole stroke play team event with each team consisting of two players. The first and third days are fourball play and the second and final days are foursomes play.

Teams

Scores

*Germany won with a par on the first playoff hole.
Source

References

World Cup (men's golf)
Golf tournaments in Barbados
WGC-World Cup
World Cup golf